The California Graduate School of Theology is an institution of higher learning in Garden Grove, California.

History

The California Graduate School of Theology was founded and chartered in the state of California in 1969 by William S. McBirnie, an ordained Southern Baptist pastor, author, and educator. Joining with McBirnie in this effort were psychologist and syndicated columnist and prominent Methodist layman Dr George Crane and Dr Robert Grant. It opened its doors one year later on the campus of the United Community Church in Glendale, CA. Classroom facilities and a beautiful library were built on the site. Past presidents have included Drs. W. S. McBirnie, Holland London, Donald Ellis, and Lawrence Wilkes. CGSOT was one of the first schools to offer extension classes in other states, including AZ, TX, MI, NY, ME, and HI. Since its inception over 6,000 students have become alums. 

Under the presidency of Lawrence Wilkes, the school relocated to the campus of The Crystal Cathedral in Garden Grove, CA before moving to its present location. Kang Won Lee is the current president.

Logo

The California Graduate School of Theology logo is the iconic image of Saint George of the Cross delivering a mortal blow to the head of a dragon, symbolizing Christ's defeat of Satan on the cross.

Degrees offered

In 2012, the California Bureau for Private Postsecondary Education (BPPE) reapproved the school to offer degrees ranging from the Bachelor of Arts/Theology, Master of Arts (MA), Master of Divinity (M.Div.), Master of  Theology (Th.M.), Doctor of Ministry (D.Min.), Doctor of Theology (Th.D.), and Doctor of Philosophy (Ph.D.).

Accreditation

CGSOT is fully accredited by the Transnational Association of Christian Colleges and Schools (TRACS), an accrediting agency authorized by the U. S Department of Education (DOE), to grant bachelors, masters, and doctoral degrees. In 2020, the undergraduate school took the name Haven University with the Graduate theology division retaining  the name California Graduate School of Theology.

References

Unaccredited Christian universities and colleges in the United States
Unaccredited institutions of higher learning in California
Educational institutions established in 1969
Transnational Association of Christian Colleges and Schools
Seminaries and theological colleges in California